Hovala dispar is a butterfly in the family Hesperiidae. It is found in central and eastern Madagascar. The habitat consists of forests.

References

Butterflies described in 1877
Heteropterinae
Butterflies of Africa
Taxa named by Paul Mabille